ABM or Abm may refer to:

Companies
 ABM Industries, a US facility management provider
 ABM Intelligence, a UK software company
 Advantage Business Media, a US digital marketing and information services company
 Associated British Maltsters, acquired by Dalgety plc

Computing
 Advanced Bit Manipulation, an instruction set extension for x86
 Agent-based model, a computational model for simulating autonomous agents
 Asynchronous Balanced Mode, an HDLC communication mode

Military
 Air Battle Manager, US Air Force rated officer position
 Anti-ballistic missile
 Anti-Ballistic Missile Treaty, 1972 arms control treaty between the US and USSR

Organizations
 Abahlali baseMjondolo, movement of South African shack dwellers
 Anglican Board of Mission - Australia, the national mission agency of the Anglican Church of Australia
 Ansar Bait al-Maqdis, an Egyptian jihadist group

Other uses
 Abanyom language of Nigeria, ISO 639-3 code
 ABM (video game), 1980 video game
 Account-based marketing, strategic approach to business marketing
 Activity-based management, method of identifying and evaluating activities that a business performs
 Agaricus blazei Murill, a species of mushroom
 Automated banking machine, Canadian term for automated teller machine
 IATA airport code for Northern Peninsula Airport, in Queensland, Australia